is a city located in Toyama Prefecture, Japan. , the city had an estimated population of 93,447 in 37,734 households and a population density of 850 persons per km².

Geography
Imizu is located in the Tonami plains of western Toyama Prefecture, with a coastline on the Sea of Japan to the north. Much of the area is a dispersed settlement typical of this region of Japan. Himi has a humid continental climate (Köppen Cfa) characterized by mild summers and cold winters with heavy snowfall.  The average annual temperature in Imizu is 14.0 °C. The average annual rainfall is 2380 mm with September as the wettest month. The temperatures are highest on average in August, at around 26.5 °C, and lowest in January, at around 2.7 °C.

Surrounding municipalities
Toyama Prefecture
 Toyama
 Takaoka
 Tonami

Demographics
Per Japanese census data, the population of Imizu has remained relatively steady in recent decades.

History
The area of present-day Imizu was part of ancient Etchū Province, and was governed during the Edo period as part of Kaga Domain.

The modern city of Imizu was established on November 1, 2005, from the merger of the city of Shinminato, the towns of Daimon, Kosugi and Ōshima, and the village of Shimo (all from Imizu District). Imizu District was dissolved as a result of this merger.

Government

Imizu has a mayor-council form of government with a directly elected mayor and a unicameral city legislature of 22 members.

Economy

Businesses headquartered in Imizu
Albis, a retail and wholesale company.
Toyo Gas Meter

Education

Colleges and universities
Toyama Prefectural University
Toyama College of Welfare Science
Toyama National College of Technology (Imizu Campus)

Primary and secondary education
Imizu has fifteen public elementary schools and six public middle schools operated by the town government, and three public high schools operated by the Toyama Prefectural Board of Education. The prefectural also operates two vocational schools in Imizu.

Transportation

Railway
 Ainokaze Toyama Railway
  - 
 Man'yōsen Shinminatokō Line
  - 
 Man'yōsen Shinminatokō Line
  -  -  -  -  -  -  -

Highway
Hokuriku Expressway

Local attractions
Kaiwomaru Park, with the training tall ship Kaiwo Maru.
Kosugimaruyama Site, an archaeological park with the ruins of a late Asuka period pottery production site.  It is a National Historic Site.
Kushidashin Site, an archaeological park containing the remnants of a late Jōmon period settlement and two circular Kofun period burial mounds. It is a National Historic Site.

Noted people from Imizu
Matsutaro Shoriki, media mogul, politician, and the father of Japanese professional baseball.
Atsushi Yanagisawa, professional football player.
Shinosuke Tatekawa, rakugo performer, and TV presenter.
Bungo Tsuda, politician.
Megumi Tachimoto, judoka

References

External links

  

 
Cities in Toyama Prefecture
Populated coastal places in Japan